The Royal School is a historic school founded in 1839 in Honolulu, Hawaii, as the Chiefs' Children's School. The school was renamed as the Royal School in 1846. After the boarding closed in 1850, it became a day school for children. It later became a public elementary school, and moved to its present campus in 1967.

The present Royal Elementary School continues to educate children from kindergarten to Grade 5 and has been named a Blue Ribbon School several times.

History 
The Chiefs' Children's School was founded by King Kamehameha III of the Kingdom of Hawaii as a boarding school to educate the children of the Hawaiian royalty (aliʻi).
The school was first located where the ʻIolani Barracks stand now. The need for the school was agreed upon during the general meeting of the mission in June 1839. The buildings were ready by 1840, and two more students were added in 1842.

An 1844 article in the Polynesian listed all children with the exception of John William Pitt Kīnaʻu, who had just enrolled, as "princes and chiefs eligible to rulers."

The main goal of this school was to educate the next generation of Hawaiian royalty to govern. Seven families that were eligible under succession laws stated in the 1840 Constitution of the Kingdom of Hawaii and that had converted to Christianity, who were Kamehameha's closest relatives, made up the majority of the school. They were:

From the sister of Kamehameha III: Kīnaʻu's children, Lot, Victoria Kamāmalu, Moses Kekuaiwa and Alexander Liholiho;
From his half-brother Pauli Kaʻōleiokū's great-granddaughter and great-great-grandson: Bernice Pauahi and John William Pitt Kīnaʻu;
From his father's younger brother, Keliʻimaikaʻi: his great-great-granddaughter, Emma Naʻea and great-great-grandson, Peter Young Kaʻeo;
From the younger brother of his father, Kalaimamahu: his great-grandson, William Charles Lunalilo;
From his father's eldest brother, Kalokuokamaile: his great-granddaughter, Elizabeth Kekaʻaniau Laʻanui;
From his grandfather's cousin, a direct line from one of the royal twins, Kameʻeiamoku's great-great-grandchildren: David Kalākaua, Lydia Kamakaeha and James Kaliokalani;
Also from his grandfather's cousin, Kahekili, daughters of Liliha with Kalaniulumoku: Jane Loeau; and with Namaile: Abigail Maheha.

It was run by Amos Starr Cooke and Juliette Montague Cooke from the American Board of Commissioners for Foreign Missions.
It was a long, two-story frame building with a large dining room and separate sleeping quarters for the children and for the Cooke family. There was also the New England parlor, furnished with handmade and treasured furniture sent from home, and with much brought from China. It resembled nothing Hawaiian in its appearance nor its atmosphere. The royal children were taught how to act like Americans and to speak like Americans. The Hawaiian kahu (traditional caretaker of children) John Papa ʻĪʻī was selected as assistant teacher.

In 1846 the Kingdom government took over funding of the school under the Minister of Public Instruction Richard Armstrong and the school was renamed the "Royal School". By 1848 the school declined as the children graduated or married. For example, Moses left school in 1847 to live with his father and died in the 1848 measles epidemic. Jane married Mr. Jasper. Missionary children were also allowed to attend in 1849. It was moved to its present location in 1850 and became a day school instead of a boarding school for the general public. The next principal was Edward Griffin Beckwith (1826–1909) until he became president of Oahu College (now Punahou School) in 1854. In 1853 it had 121 students, of which 8 were pure Hawaiian and 18 part Hawaiian.

Current day
It is now a public elementary school, Royal Elementary School, the oldest school on the island of Oʻahu. It serves grades K-5 and is located at 1519 Queen Emma Street, coordinates .
A sculpture by Kim Duffett "Mai ka Hina Kua a ka Hina Alo" was added in 2005. It was partially funded by a foundation named for the Cooke Family.

Alumni

Ruling alumni
Queen Liliuokalani
Queen Emma, wife of Kamehameha IV
King David Kalākaua
King Kamehameha IV
King Kamehameha V
Princess Victoria Kamāmalu, Kuhina Nui
King William Charles Lunalilo

Aliʻi alumni
Aliʻi Bernice Pauahi Bishop
Aliʻi Abigail Maheha
Aliʻi Mary Polly Paʻaʻāina
Aliʻi Peter Young Kaeo
Aliʻi Elizabeth Kekaʻaniau Pratt
Prince Moses Kekūāiwa
Prince John William Pitt Kīnaʻu
Ali'i James Kaliokalani

Aliʻi alumni as day school
Gideon Kailipalaki Laanui
Nancy Sumner
Jane Swinton
Martha Swinton
Julia Moemalie
Mary Ann Kiliwehi
John Mahiʻai Kāneakua

References

External links
Royal Elementary School website

Further reading
 

Educational institutions established in 1839
Royalty of the Hawaiian Kingdom
History of Oahu
Schools in Honolulu County, Hawaii
1839 establishments in Hawaii